Isotenes tetrops is a species of moth of the family Tortricidae. It is found on New Guinea.

References

Moths described in 1944
Archipini